Allen H. Hamiter (November 27, 1867 – February 9, 1933) was an American politician. He was a member of the Arkansas House of Representatives, serving from 1905 to 1909. He was a member of the Democratic party.

References

1933 deaths
1867 births
People from Lafayette County, Arkansas
Speakers of the Arkansas House of Representatives
Democratic Party members of the Arkansas House of Representatives